Ryan Swope (born September 20, 1990) is a former American football wide receiver. He was drafted by the Arizona Cardinals in the 2013 NFL Draft.

College career
As a sophomore at Texas A&M in 2010, Swope and Jeff Fuller both broke Rod Bernstine’s 24 year-old school single-season receptions record with 72. As a junior the following season, Swope broke his own record for receptions and set the record for single-season receiving yards with 89 catches for 1,207 yards. He also had 11 receiving touchdowns that year, which at the time was the second highest single-season total on school history. As a senior in 2012, he set the school record for career receptions with 252. Although his single-season yardage record has since been broken by Mike Evans, his season and career reception records both still stand.

Swope was also a sprinter, with a personal best of 10.70 seconds in the 100 meters.

Professional career

Swope was drafted in the 6th round of the 2013 NFL Draft by the Arizona Cardinals.

On July 25, 2013, the Cardinals announced that Swope was placed on the reserve/retired list due to ongoing concussion issues.

References

External links
 Texas A&M profile

1990 births
Living people
American football wide receivers
Texas A&M Aggies football players
Players of American football from Austin, Texas
Arizona Cardinals players